Warsaw Governorate was an administrative unit (governorate) of Congress Poland.

It was created in 1844 from the Masovia and Kalisz Governorates, and had the capital in Warsaw. In 1867 territories of the Warsaw Governorate were divided into three smaller governorates: a smaller Warsaw Governorate, Piotrków Governorate and the recreated Kalisz Governorate.

A small reform in 1893 increased the Warsaw Governorate's size with territories split from Płock and Łomża governorates.

Language

By the Imperial census of 1897. In bold are languages spoken by more people than the state language.

Governors

 Evgeni Rozhnov (1863-24.10.1866)
 Baron Nikolai Medem (24.10.1866—01.01.1892)
 Yuliy Andreev (16.01.1892—27.02.1897)
 Dmitri Martynov (03.03.1897—20.01.1907)
 Baron Semyon Korf (20.01.1907—1914)
 Piotr Stremoukhov (1914—1916)

References and notes

 
Governorates of Congress Poland
States and territories established in 1844
History of Warsaw